Notable people with surname Voogd include:
Bob de Voogd (born 1988), Dutch field hockey player
Floris de Voogd (c.1228-1258), brother and proxy of William II of Holland 
Hendrik Voogd (1768–1839), painter and printmaker
Jan de Voogd (1924-2015), Dutch politician

See also
Vogt (surname) for an alternate spelling
Voogd for the name's origin